Denmark was represented by Hot Eyes (the name chosen for use at Eurovision by Kirsten and Søren), with the song "Ka' du se hva' jeg sa'?", at the 1988 Eurovision Song Contest, which took place on 30 April in Dublin. "Ka' du se hva' jeg sa'?" was chosen as the Danish entry at the Dansk Melodi Grand Prix on 27 February. This was the last of three Eurovision appearances for Kirsten and Søren.

Kirsten and Søren's Eurovision performance is noted for the fact that Kirsten was heavily and very visibly pregnant at the time.

Before Eurovision

Dansk Melodi Grand Prix 1988 
The final was held at the DR TV studios in Copenhagen, hosted by Jørgen Mylius. Ten songs took part with the winner being decided by voting from five regional juries. Firstly the five lowest-placed songs were eliminated without full voting being revealed, then the remaining five were voted on again to give the winner.

At Eurovision 
On the night of the final Hot Eyes performed 13th in the running order, following Austria and preceding Greece. At the close of voting "Ka' du se hva' jeg sa'?" had received 92 points, placing Denmark third of the 21 entries, the country's best placing since the victory of Grethe and Jørgen Ingmann in 1963. The Danish jury awarded its 12 points to Yugoslavia.

Voting

References 

1988
Countries in the Eurovision Song Contest 1988
Eurovision